Laurane Tanner Bullock Boreman (November 24, 1830 – April 14, 1908) was the wife of former Governor of West Virginia Arthur I. Boreman and served as that state's First Lady, 1869.  She was born on May 1, 1830, at Wheeling, Virginia (now in West Virginia). Her first husband, John Oldham Bullock, was a Union soldier killed early in the Civil War.  On November 30, 1864, she married Arthur I. Boreman. She helped define the role of the first lady, hosting formal gatherings at the Boreman's home in Wheeling. After leaving office, the Boremans moved to Washington, D.C. where Gov. Boremen served one term in the United States Senate and then to Parkersburg, West Virginia, where she died on April 14, 1908.

References

1830 births
1908 deaths
People from Wheeling, West Virginia
First Ladies and Gentlemen of West Virginia
Boreman family